Edna Mosher (July 20, 1878 – May 7, 1972) was a Canadian entomologist and lepidopterist known for her pioneering work on Lepidoptera pupae morphology.

Early life and education
Edna Mosher was born in July 1878 at Kempt Shore, Hants County, Nova Scotia to John Fulton and Margaret Harvie Mosher. She learned natural history from her father and grandfather, and her mother and grandmother taught her horticulture. From an early age, she expressed a desire to teach. She graduated from Provincial Normal School. Her initial attempts to attend a university were hindered by the fact she was a woman. In 1905, she began a class in gardening at Cornell University. She was then able to obtain permission to pursue a degree in science. At Cornell, she studied botany and zoology; it is where she first took entomology.

After graduating with a Bachelor's of Science in 1908, she obtained a fellowship in entomology at the University of Illinois. She earned her Master of Science in 1913. She was denied a fellowship for a Doctor of Philosophy because she was a woman. The Illinois Natural History Survey offered her work, which she excepted. In 1914, she was granted a fellowship that would allow her to turn her work with the Illinois Natural History Survey into a doctoral dissertation. In 1915, she was awarded a doctorate, and her thesis A Classification of the Lepidoptera based on characters of the pupae was published as a major bulletin of the Illinois State Laboratory of Natural History. Mosher's thesis, considered pioneering at the time, remains a definitive work on Lepidoptera.

Career
Edna Mosher taught school in Nova Scotia from 1902–1905 to earn enough to pay for her own education. After earning her Bachelor's degree, Mosher was a supervisor of nature study and school gardens until 1910. She taught for a time at Gary, Indiana. In 1913 she began work for the Illinois Natural History Survey. In 1915 she worked at the Maine Agricultural Experiment Station for a summer. Following that, she was an instructor at Illinois, Ohio State University, and eventually the University of New Mexico. At the University of New Mexico, she became a Professor of Biology and later Dean of Women. In 1923, after her mother fell ill, Mosher moved to Garden City, New York where she taught biology at Adelphi University until retirement in 1942. She died May 7, 1972 in Windsor, Nova Scotia.

Awards and honors 
Mosher was the first woman fellow of the Entomological Society of America, in 1920.

References

1878 births
1972 deaths
Canadian lepidopterists
Women entomologists
University of Illinois alumni
Cornell University alumni
Ohio State University faculty
University of Illinois faculty
University of New Mexico faculty
American university and college faculty deans
Women deans (academic)
People from Hants County, Nova Scotia
Adelphi University faculty
20th-century Canadian zoologists
20th-century Canadian women scientists
Canadian women biologists
Canadian expatriate academics in the United States
Fellows of the Entomological Society of America